Keanu John Apperley (London, 25 June 1992) is an English born Italian rugby union player. His usual position is as a Fullback or Fly-half and he currently plays for Viadana in Top12.

In 2012, he was named in the Italy Under 20.

References

External links 
It's Rugby England Profile
Eurosport Profile

1992 births
Living people
English rugby union players
Rugby union players from London
Rugby Viadana players
Rugby union fly-halves